is a Japanese training sailing ship operated by the National Institute for Sea Training out of Tokyo.  She was built by Sumitomo Heavy Industries in Uraga, Kanagawa, and was launched on 15 February 1984, with her commissioning occurring on 16 September. She was built as a replacement for the 1930-built barque Nippon Maru.

Her gross tonnage is 2,891. She has a crew complement of 70, with a training complement of 120 trainees.

References

1984 ships
Sail training ships
Tall ships of Japan
Training ships of Japan
Ships built by Sumitomo Heavy Industries